Columbia County Education Campus is a public alternative school in St. Helens, Oregon, United States.

Academics
In 2008, 50% of the school's seniors received their high school diploma. Of 36 students, 18 graduated, 6 dropped out, and 12 are still in high school.

References

High schools in Columbia County, Oregon
Alternative schools in Oregon
Education in Columbia County, Oregon
St. Helens, Oregon
Public middle schools in Oregon
Public high schools in Oregon